Luis Felipe Noé (born May 26, 1933) is an Argentine artist, writer, intellectual and teacher. He is known in his home country as Yuyo. In 1961 he formed Otra Figuración (another figuration) with three other Argentine artists. Their eponymous exhibition and subsequent work greatly influenced the Neofiguration (Neo-figuration, New figuration) movement. After the group disbanded, Noé relocated to New York City where he painted and showed assemblages that stretched the boundaries of the canvas.

In 1965 he published his groundbreaking theoretical work, Antiestética. He then took a ten-year hiatus from painting and upon return to Buenos Aires opened a bar, taught, wrote and created installations with mirrors. A military coup coincided with his painting comeback, and in 1976 Noé migrated to Paris where he continued to experiment, both with canvas re-texturing and the drawing process. His later paintings move away from the figure and focus on elements of landscape.

Noé lives and works in Buenos Aires. His son, Gaspar Noé is a Franco-Argentine filmmaker.

Education
Luis Felipe Noé studied painting with Horacio Butler from 1950 to 1952 but is “essentially considered self-taught.” He also studied law at the Universidad de Buenos Aires and wrote art reviews for various newspapers prior to his first exhibit in 1959 at the Galeria Witcomb.

Career

Otra Figuración (1960−1965)

Painting
In 1960 the artists of Otra Figuración began to live and work together in an apartment building that doubled as a studio in Carlos Pellegrini Street in Buenos Aires. The collective included Rómulo Macció, Ernesto Deira, Jorge de la Vega, Luis Felipe Noé and for a short while, Antonio Seguí who exhibited briefly with the group but is not generally considered a member of Otra Figuración since his style quickly diverged. The “violent, disturbing” work that emerged from the group's first exhibition at the Galeria Peuser in 1961, also titled Otra Figuración “reflected a nation whose history and everyday life were so marked by violent occurrences.”

His two seminal paintings from this period are Introduccion a la esperanza (Introduction to Hope) and Cerrado por brujería (Closed for Sorcery), both from 1963.
Esperanza won the prestigious Premio Palanza given by the Instituto Torcuato Di Tella in 1963. The painting depicts an amorphous, riotous mass of open-mouthed figures proffering signs that read “Champion, do not leave us,” and “Vote for blind force,” while additional signs set on plywood stems sprout from the top of the canvas and display portraits of political candidates. The work embodies nine separate canvases, communicating a sense of the overwhelming anarchy and continual unrest that defines Argentina's political process. The crowd forms one massive animal that blindly jostles and lobbies for some low level of survival, complicit in elevating the oppressors who cynically grin and bob far above them. In contrast, Cerrado depicts the people not as an indistinguishable mass but as individual grimacing visages trapped within a grid of boxes. The cloaked figure of a sorcerer looms above, nullified by a crucifix, surrounded by ferocious, fantasy animals. The iconography and structure of the painting suggest ideological incoherency and social chaos, belief systems or regimes continually supplanting one another and in flux while the citizens remain caged.

Drawing
An exhibition composed exclusively of drawings by the group in 1962, titled Esto at Galeria Lirolay in Buenos Aires had a significant impact on autonomous, experimental drawing in Latin American art. Otra Figuración emphasized process over technique. They influenced contemporaries Alberto Heredia, Cildo Meireles, Rubens Gerchman and Antonio Dias among others. The exhibit emerged from the political climate in 1962, one Noé likened to “social dislocation” and then linked to the “structural dislocation” apparent in the drawings. With the president of Argentina deposed by the military, Buenos Aires was once again in chaos and facing civil war. Emblematic of the exhibit, Noé's Sin titulo (Untitled) uses black India ink on pulp to create an artwork defaced with random slashes and blots, featuring rotund, distorted figures gathered around a black exploding center. Although the work appears to contain surreal elements, it's a true, psychological and emotional expression of Argentina's then current and seemingly perpetual social and political disorder.

Otra Figuración was officially discontinued in 1963, although the group continued to exhibit together until 1965.

New York (1965−1966)
Following Otra Figuración disbanding in 1965, that same year Noé received a Guggenheim fellowship that allowed him to relocate to New York City. He pushed his ideas regarding chaos even further at this time, creating huge, unsaleable and difficult-to-store assemblages—even throwing his work into the Hudson River. He also published Antiestética in 1965, a text explicating his theories on chaos, “the purpose of anti-aesthetics today is to split the concept of unity.” In the introduction to the 1966 exhibition brochure at Bonino Gallery in New York City, Noé revised an earlier opinion on the fusion of figures, reflecting the contradictions in both Argentina and Latin America, writing that “the essential element of contemporary society is the tension and opposition among diverging cosmovisions, the fraternizations of opposing atmospheres.”

The paintings in the show were prefigured by his 1962 work, Mambo, a deconstructed painting that featured the front and back of the work, an “inverted painting...hinting at another side of painting...abandoning neo-figurative painting.” The 1966 Bonino Gallery exhibition included Three doors: distorted, haunted faces painted as isolated fragments on old, hinged-together panel doors—some with missing or broken panels, and also the huge, ironically titled Balance.  This assemblage consisted of several large canvases, some lying on the floor, others propped precariously against each other or along walls, some with sections popped out and up from the canvas, displayed like fragile paper dolls on a stand. His attempt to order chaos had led to “pictures of broken vision.”

After this exhibition, Noé returned to Buenos Aires and stopped painting entirely for almost ten years. The sabbatical is attributed to a combination of existential crisis  and commercial failure.

Buenos Aires (1967−1976)
Upon return to Buenos Aires, Noé opened a bar (Barbaro) that was frequented by the literati. Even though he'd temporarily abandoned painting, his creative impulse never abated. Noé  taught during these years and continued to innovate spatially, using distortion mirrors to arrange installations which he exhibited at the Museo de Bellas Artes de Caracas in 1968. The mirrors helped him to visualize the characters in his 1974 experimental novel Recontrapoder, a philosophical exploration of fragmentation, absurdity, power and aesthetics.

For Noé, life in Buenos Aires was absurd. Restoration of order meant empowering a repressive government, while protest resulted in riots and endless social upheaval. Ironically, one of the worst political crises in Argentina's history coincided with his return to painting. He said during the 1975 exhibition, "I feel...like a mirror facing both the ghost of a dead person and the future latency of an unborn."

Strife had escalated since the late 1960s, adding to Buenos Aires’ usual instability. Radicals, ex-Peronists, writers and intellectuals joined urban guerillas, creating even further havoc. Strikes, riots and economic collapse followed. The chaotic situation turned dire in 1974 when Isabel Perón took power and street fighting between right-wing death squads and guerillas surged. Bombings and atrocities became routine; riots were used as an excuse for military brutality and takeover. The coup in 1976 resulted in an estimated 9,000-30,000 “disappeared.” Noé went into exile, relocating to Paris.

Paris (1976−1987)
Noé's art continued to evolve in Paris. Once again, he altered the frame of reference by re-texturizing huge pieces of canvas before painting, “crumpling and gathering, then stapling to the stretcher...creating a tortured surface for paint..” He also began painting expressive landscapes that reflected both internal and external turbulence, such as The Storm in 1982.

He experimented further with drawing technique in Paris, creating a “progressive, narrative transformation of the original image” by using a Xerox to copy multiple redrawn versions of an original. Works such as One Passion and Four Transformations were considered a return to Otra Figuración's platform, “drawing as process rather than mimesis and formal idealization.”

Later work (1987−1997)
Noé returned, as always, to Buenos Aires in 1987 and continued to work with oversized canvases and landscape elements. His 1997 exhibition at Centro Cultural Borges and Galeria Rubbers in Buenos Aires consisted of a total of 60 canvases, all painted in 1997. Noé introduced a new visual element in this show, "violently colored stripes...to energize his landscapes." He also repeated the crumpled canvas technique developed in the 1980s to great effect in the painting Ominoso, a field of blue sporting streamers of crushed and painted canvas.

Artistry
Stylistic hallmarks of Otra Figuración's version of Neofiguration are strong, vivid colors and spontaneous, slashing brushwork; fusion of fragmented and distorted figures with each other and animals; political content; extreme sense of kinesis and the appearance of anarchy on canvas. Structurally, the group made use of collage, mixed media, oversized canvases, and assemblages that gave many of the works a sculptural quality. Overall, the artwork managed to merge form, content, process and philosophy.

The philosophical platform of the group and its art are best expressed by Noé, “I believe in chaos as a value.” He doesn't demonize chaos but acknowledges and accepts the reality of its inescapable existence. The group's art reflects the political instability and uncertainty of life in Buenos Aires and also, in a larger sense, an awareness of the precarious situation of all human beings living in the incoherent modern world. Noé proposed that in such a world, chaos itself must become an organizing principle. Noé embraces both political and human chaos in his work, fearlessly entering the eye of the storm.

Influences
Informalism was the predominant movement in Argentina at the time, and Noé's influences were the painters Sarah Grilo and José Antonio Fernández-Muro. Other acknowledged Argentine influences on both Noé and his fellow-artists who later comprised Otra Figuración, were the politically oriented neo-figurist Antonio Berni and the Boa group. The Europeans collectively known as Cobra, as well as Antonio Saura, Francis Bacon, Willem de Kooning and Jean Dubuffet may also have inspired the artists of Otra Figuración and are often referred to as comparable contemporaries in certain respects (de Kooning's brushwork for instance), although they obviously differ in others.

Awards and honours
Noé was honored with a retrospective in 1995/1996 at the Museo Nacional de Bellas Artes in Buenos Aires and the Palacio de Bellas Artes in Mexico City.

In 2002 Konex Foundation from Argentina, granted him the Diamond Konex Award for Visual Arts as the most important artist in the last decade in his country. In 2003, he collaborated with Nahuel Rando on the graphic novel, Las aventuras de Recontrapoder, re-imagining his anti-hero for a new generation.

Selected artworks
 Convocatoria a la barbarie (Summoning to a Barbarism)
From the Federal series, 1961
Mixed media on canvas
58 ¼ X 87 ¾ (148 x 223 cm)
Private collection, Buenos Aires

 La anarquía del año XX, 1961
Oil on canvas
115 x 229 cm
Museo Nacional de Bellas Artes, Buenos Aires

 Sin titulo (Untitled), 1962
Ink on paper
11 ½ x 15 1/8 (29.5 x 38.5 cm)
Collection Marcos Curi, Buenos Aires

 Mambo, 1962
Mixed media on canvas and wood
98 3/8 x 87 ¾ (148 x 223 cm)
Luis Felipe Noé, Buenos Aires

 Introducción a la esperanza (Introduction to Hope), 1963
Oil on canvas: nine panels, overall approximately:
68 ¾ x 7 5/8 (205 x 215 cm)
Museo Nacional de Bellas Artes, Buenos Aires

 Cerrado por brujería (Closed for Sorcery), 1963
Oil and collage on canvas, 78 ½ x 98 ¼ (199.6 x 249.7 cm)
Jack S. Blanton Museum of Art (formerly Archer M Huntington
Art Gallery), The University of Texas at Austin

 Algún día de estos (One of These Days), 1963
Mixed media on canvas
70 7/8 X 1181/8 (180 x 300 cm)
Private collection, Buenos Aires

 Nuestro Señor de cada día (Our Lord of Everyday Use), 1964
Mixed media
98 3/8 x 78 ¾ (250 x 200 cm)
Private collection, Buenos Aires

 That is Life, 1965
Collage with India ink and
colored pencils, 13 7/8 x 16 13/16
Collection Archer M. Huntington Art Gallery

 Balance. (fragment). Oil assemblage, 1964–65
Luis Noé papers, Buenos Aires.

 Three doors. Oil on doors, 79 X 29, 79 X 30, 79 X 20, 1964
Luis Noé papers, Buenos Aires.

 One Passion and Four Transformations, 1982
India ink and photocopy on paper
5 panels, one frame
17 6/8 x 58 3/8 (45 x 148 cm)
Collection the artist

 Tempestad (The Storm), 1982
 En la Marana, 1986
Acrylic on Canvas
200 x 250 cm
Museo Nacional de Bellas Artes, Buenos Aires

 Tormenta de la Pampa (Storm of the Pampas), 1991
Tribute to a passage written by Sarmiento (Diptico)
Mixed media on canvas
215 x 250 cm
Collection Amalia Lacroze de Fortabat

 Ominoso, 1997
Mixed media on canvas
79 X 98

Significant exhibitions
Noé had more than 40 one-man exhibitions by the mid-1980s and also participated in numerous group shows. A few of the most notable are listed below.

One-man exhibitions
1959 Galeria Witcomb, Buenos Aires (his debut)
1965 Museo de Arte Moderno, Buenos Aires
1966 Galeria Bonino, New York
1987 Retrospective at the Museo de Artes Plasticas Eduardo Sivori, Buenos Aires
1995 Retrospective at the Museo Nacional de Bellas Artes, Buenos Aires
1996 Retrospective at the Palacio de Bellas Artes, Mexico City
1997 Centro Cultural Borges, Buenos Aires

Group exhibitions: Deira, Macció, de la Vega, Noé
1961 Otra Figuración, Galeria Peuser, Buenos Aires (Otra Figuración debut)
1962 Esto (drawings), Galeria Lirolay & Galeria Bonino, Buenos Aires
1963 Museo Nacional de Bellas Artes, Buenos Aires
1965 Galeria Bonino, Buenos Aires

International group exhibitions
1964 Guggenheim International Award, Solomon R. Guggenheim Museum, NYC
1964 New Art of Argentina, Walker Art Center, Minneapolis
1965 The Emergent Decade: Latin American Painters and Paintings in the 1960s, The Solomon R. Guggenheim Museum, NYC

Competition exhibition in Argentina
1963 Premio Nacional, Instituto Torcuato Di Tella, Buenos Aires (awarded the Premio Palanza)

Writings
Noé, Luis Felipe. Antiestética. Buenos Aires: Van Riel, 165 and De la Flor, 1988.
Noé, Luis Felipe. Una Sociedad Colonial Avanzada. Buenos Aires: De la Flor, 1971
Noé, Luis Felipe. Recontrapoder. Buenos Aires: De la Flor, 1974.
Noé, Luis Felipe. A Oriente por Occidente. Bogota: Dos Graficos, 1992.
Noé, Luis Felipe. El Otro, la Otra y la Otredad. Buenos Aires: IMPSAT, 1994
Noé, Luis Felipe and Rando, Nahuel. Las aventuras de Recontrapoder. Buenos Aires: De la Flor, 2003. (Graphic novel)

Notes
 Ades, Dawn. Art in Latin American: The Modern Era, 1820-1980. New Haven & London: Yale University Press, 1993.
 Glusberg, Jorge. Del Pop-art a la nueva imagen. Buenos Aires: Ediciones de Arte Gaglianone, 1985.
 Lewis, Colin M. A Short History of Argentina. Oxford: Oneworld Publications, 2002.
 Lucie-Smith, Edward. Latin American Art of the 20th Century. London: Thames & Hudson Ltd., 1993 and 2004.

References

External links

 The Legacy Project
 Luis Felipe Noé background and images of later paintings All-sa.com
 Cerrado por brujería (Closed for Sorcery) Lanic Utexas

Argentine painters
Argentine male painters
Argentine artists
Living people
1933 births
Argentine contemporary artists